was a Japanese prelate of the Roman Catholic Church. He served as Archbishop of Nagasaki from 1937 to 1968.

Biography
Yamaguchi was born in Nishisonogi District, Nagasaki (currently part of the city of Nagasaki). He attended the Urbino University in Rome, where he was consecrated as a priest on December 24, 1923. In 1924, he returned to Nagasaki, where he was appointed priest of the Tainoura Church in Shin-Kamigotō in the Gotō Islands. In 1926, he became a professor at the Nagasaki Catholic University. He was appointed chief priest of the Nakamachi Church in Nagasaki in 1930. From November 1936, he was also appointed to the Prefecture Apostolic of Kagoshima. He was elevated to bishop on November 7, 1937.

In August 1943, Yamaguchi was sent by the Civil Administration Office of the Imperial Japanese Navy’s Southwest Area Fleet to the Japanese-occupied island of Flores in the Netherlands East Indies. Flores had a predominantly Roman Catholic population, and Yamaguchi struggled to obtain a lenient attitude from the Navy authorities towards the local population.

After the end of the war, Yamaguchi returned to the ruins of atomic-bombed Nagasaki, where he devoted his efforts towards the reconstruction of churches destroyed by the bombing. In 1948, in an extraordinary session of the city council, he was appointed to the Nagasaki City Public Safety Commission to oversee reforms of the police administration. He was elevated to archbishop on September 27, 1959 after Nagasaki was promoted to an archdiocese. On June 8, 1962, he presided over a mass commemorating the centenary of canonization of the Twenty-six Martyrs of Japan. From 1962 to 1965, he attended the Second Vatican Council. He retired on December 19, 1968.

References

External links
Archbishop Paul Aijirô Yamaguchi † - Catholic-Hierarchy Website

1894 births
1976 deaths
People from Nagasaki Prefecture
Participants in the Second Vatican Council
20th-century Roman Catholic archbishops in Japan
Japanese Roman Catholic archbishops